Inge Konradi (27 July 1924  4 February 2002) was an Austrian stage and film actress.

Selected filmography
 The Heavenly Waltz (1948)
 Adventure in Vienna (1952)
 Stolen Identity (1953)
 Must We Get Divorced? (1953)
 The King of Bernina (1957)
 The Spendthrift (1964)

References

Bibliography 
 Fritsche, Maria. Homemade Men in Postwar Austrian Cinema: Nationhood, Genre and Masculinity. Berghahn Books, 2013.
 Goble, Alan. The Complete Index to Literary Sources in Film. Walter de Gruyter, 1999.

External links 
 

1924 births
2002 deaths
Austrian television actresses
Austrian stage actresses
Austrian film actresses
Actresses from Vienna